Scotland's Great Trails are long-distance "people-powered" trails in Scotland, analogous to the National Trails of England and Wales or the Grande Randonnée paths of France. The designated routes are primarily intended for walkers, but may have sections suitable for cyclists and horse-riders; one of the trails, the Great Glen Canoe Trail, is designed for canoeists and kayakers.

In order to be classified as one of Scotland’s Great Trails, a route must fulfil certain criteria. The route must be at least  in length, and be clearly waymarked with a dedicated symbol. It is expected that visitor services will be present along the way, and that the route will have an online presence to help visitors in planning their journey. Trails are required to run largely off-road, with less than 20% of the route on tarmac. NatureScot is the custodian of the Scotland's Great Trails brand, maintaining the official list and providing some finance and publicity, the responsibility however for creating and maintaining each route lies with the local authorities through which a route passes. There are 29 routes, providing  of trails in total. Additionally, the northernmost  of the Pennine Way between the Anglo-Scottish border and Kirk Yetholm lie within Scotland, although are designated as one of the National Trails of England.

The route of each of the Great Trails is marked with coloured diamonds on Ordnance Survey Explorer (1:25000) and Landranger (1:50000) maps; the SGT logo of a thistle within a hexagon is also used to highlight the routes at the 1:25000 scale.

History

The trails grew out of the Long Distance Routes (LDRs), which were proposed and financially supported by Scottish Natural Heritage (SNH), and administered and maintained by the local authorities. The Countryside (Scotland) Act 1967 provided the legal basis for the Long Distance Routes, but the first one was not opened officially until 1980. By 2010 there were four LDRs:
West Highland Way, opened in 1980
Speyside Way, opened in 1981
Southern Upland Way, opened in 1984
Great Glen Way, opened in 2002

Following the passage of the Land Reform Act (Scotland) 2003, the public has a right to responsible access to most land in Scotland, in accordance with the Scottish Outdoor Access Code. Access rights for new routes therefore largely no longer required to be negotiated and many named walks have been developed by local authorities, tourist organisations and guidebook authors. In 2010 SNH decided that it would not formally designate any further LDRs, but would instead encourage more locally-based proposals for new routes for long-distance footpaths. Within this approach it was recognised that there was a need for a strong "brand identity" to aid marketing of Scotland’s longer distance routes internationally. Minimum standards would be applied in the selection of these branded routes, which would take account of factors such as:
safety
attractiveness of scenery
trail surfaces
information
facilities and services
signage and waymarking
route definition and continuity
accessibility
access by public and private transport
route management

"Scotland's Great Trails" was chosen as the brand identity, and as of 2018 there were 29 officially recognised Great Trails.

Routes
As of April 2018.

References

Citations

Bibliography

External links

 Walkhighlands

See also
 Long-distance footpaths in Scotland
 National Trail (English and Welsh equivalent)
 Long-distance footpaths in the UK
 Scottish Coastal Way